Joost Winnink (born 30 June 1971) is a former professional tennis player from the Netherlands.

Career
Winnink, and his partner Filip Dewulf, reached the semi-finals of the 1994 Monte Carlo Open, but his best result on the ATP Tour was when he finished runner-up at the 1995 South African Open, also in the doubles. 

In 1994 at the "Melkhuisje" (in his home country) Winnink upset the gravel specialist Àlex Corretja in straight sets.

At the 1995 Eurocard Open, a Masters Series event, Winnink upset countryman and world number 21 Paul Haarhuis in straight sets, dropping just two games. He also reached the quarter-finals of the Czech Indoor tournament that year, en route defeating Javier Frana and David Prinosil, both top 100 players.

He competed in the singles draw of a Grand Slam just once. This was at the 1995 US Open where he reached the second round with a win over Greg Rusedski. With playing partner David Prinosil he demolished the then Davis Cup doubles team of Palmer/Reneburg in the first round. This was one of two occasions he made it past the first round.

ATP Career Finals

Doubles: 1 (0–1)

Challenger titles

Doubles: (7)

References

1971 births
Living people
Dutch male tennis players
People from Noordenveld
Sportspeople from Drenthe